Sebo may refer to:

 Sebo, vacuum cleaner brand
 Sebo (name)
 Caleta de Sebo, settlement in the Canary Islands
 Palo-sebo, Filipino game